Universal's Islands of Adventure (also known as Islands of Adventure or IOA), originally called Universal Studios Islands of Adventure, is a theme park located in Orlando, Florida. It opened on May 28, 1999, along with CityWalk, as part of an expansion that converted Universal Studios Florida into the Universal Orlando Resort. The resort's slogan Vacation Like You Mean It was introduced in 2013.

Islands of Adventure is modeled after a journey of exploration, where guests embark on an adventure to visit a variety of themed islands. Initially, the park featured six islands. A seventh, The Wizarding World of Harry Potter, was added in 2010, themed to the highly successful Harry Potter franchise. It was Universal's largest investment since the resort's founding in 1990. The expansion led to a significant increase in attendance, and in 2013, Islands of Adventure ranked seventh domestically and eleventh internationally after hosting approximately 8.1 million guests. The eighth island, Skull Island, opened on July 13, 2016, and is themed to the King Kong franchise.

Licensed properties

Like Universal Studios Florida next door, Islands of Adventure has not limited itself to Universal's own library, because it licensed other characters from rival studios, many of whom did not own theme parks of their own, as attractions and lands. Some of these include: 
 Dr. Seuss properties (Dr. Seuss Enterprises)
 Harry Potter book and film franchise (J.K. Rowling and Warner Bros. Entertainment)
 Popeye (King Features Syndicate and E.C. Segar)
 Pre-2009 Marvel Comics (Marvel Entertainment)

History
Before Islands of Adventure was built, the site was originally planned as a shopping mall called Galleria Orlando. Plans were first drawn up for the mall in 1985, but it was ultimately canceled in 1990, the same year Universal Studios Florida opened next door.

Preview Center
During the construction of IOA, Universal opened the Islands of Adventure Preview Center at adjacent Universal Studios Florida. Opening two years before the new theme park, the Preview Center was designed to give guests a sneak peek at some of the themes and attractions for Islands of Adventure. The attraction was located in the Paradise Theater building located in the New York section of Universal Studios Florida, next to the Kongfrontation attraction. In the attraction, guests would walk through various rooms themed to the various "Islands" in the new park. The final room stated when the Islands of Adventure park would open, and showed guests Universal's future plans for the Universal Orlando Resort. The Preview Center was closed shortly after the opening of Islands of Adventure. The space that was used for the preview center is now a locker room and a year round "Tribute Store".

Opening
Islands of Adventure had a soft opening beginning March 27, 1999, during which visitors could preview the park at a discounted price while the staff conducted a technical rehearsal and worked on the "finishing touches." During this soft opening, guests were informed that attractions might open and close throughout the day without notice and that some attractions might not be open at all. Initial plans were to open the park in mid-May, but this was ultimately delayed until May 28, 1999.

After the enormous capital expenditure required to build Islands of Adventure, CityWalk, and the resort hotels, Universal sought to overtake nearby Walt Disney World in attendance. However, with the addition of the second park, new resorts, and entertainment district, the resort was named Universal Studios Escape. Essentially, it seemed that visitors were confused by the name, assuming that Islands of Adventure was a new area added to the already-existing Universal Studios Florida theme park. For the first two years, attendance did not rise as expected. By 2001, the marketing was revamped, clarifying that Islands of Adventure was indeed a second, completely separate park with new rides and attractions. Universal Studios Escape was renamed Universal Orlando Resort, and ended up being the only resort in the Orlando area to actually have an increase in attendance after the September 11 attacks on the United States.

Timeline

Former attractions

As with almost any amusement park, older attractions are sometimes removed to make way for newer ones. At Islands of Adventure, some have simply been closed with no replacement like Island Skipper Tours while others like Poseidon's Fury were changed from their initial concept to the attraction that operates today.

Islands

Islands of Adventure consists of eight themed "islands", the majority of which are based on licensed intellectual properties, with only two lands based on original Universal Pictures works. They are, in clockwise order from entry: Port of Entry, Marvel Super Hero Island, Toon Lagoon, Skull Island, Jurassic Park, The Wizarding World of Harry Potter, The Lost Continent, and Seuss Landing.

Port of Entry

Port of Entry is the park's main entrance and is home to many shops and services including Guest Services aptly named The Open Arms Hotel. The park's centerpiece, Pharos Lighthouse, is also located within Port of Entry. Each night, this functioning lighthouse sends out a bright beam to lead visitors to and from the park's gates. Like many theme parks using the "hub and spokes" format, this entry Island contains no rides. It has dining options including Croissant Moon Bakery™, Backwater Bar, The Grinch™ & Friends Character Breakfast, Confisco Grille™, Starbucks®, & Cinnabon®. It has shopping options such as Port Provisions™, Island Market and Export™ Candy Shoppe, DeFoto's Expedition Photography™, Port of Entry™ Christmas Shoppe, Ocean Trader Market™, and Islands of Adventure Trading Company™

Marvel Super Hero Island

Marvel Super Hero Island is based on the superhero characters featured in Marvel Comics. The area features comic-book styled architecture; many of the building interiors are created in comic book perspective, with exaggerated lines and angles. Many exteriors are painted in a special paint which appears to change color based on the angle from which it is viewed – sometimes purple, sometimes orange. The buildings are all labelled generically: "Store," "Shop," "Food," and "Comics", etc.

The area is also home to a variety of dining outlets and merchandise shops. Food and beverage items can be purchased from Cafe 4 and Captain America Diner. Merchandise items can be bought from a variety of themed stores including Spider-Man Shop (The Amazing Adventures of Spider-Man), Marvel Alterniverse Store, Comic Book Shop, and Oakley.

There's also "Meet Spider-Man and the Marvel Super Heroes", a meet-and-greet attraction, where guests can meet superheroes including Wolverine, Storm, Cyclops and Rogue, Spider-Man, and Captain America.

In late 2009, The Walt Disney Company (Universal's biggest competitor in the theme park market) announced that it had sought to acquire Marvel Entertainment. Universal announced that Marvel's new ownership would not affect Marvel Super Hero Island, and Disney CEO Bob Iger acknowledged that Disney would continue to honor any contracts that Marvel currently has with Disney competitors. In March 2012, Bob Iger revealed that Disney had begun preliminary concepts of incorporating Marvel's properties into their parks, although no major negotiations with Universal were announced. Hong Kong Disneyland has since announced an expansion to its park featuring characters from the Marvel Universe. Disney California Adventure Park at the Disneyland Resort in California has also since incorporated meet-and-greet Marvel characters, as well as an Avengers Super Hero Half Marathon Weekend at the resort. Both Hong Kong Disneyland and Disney California Adventure have opened Marvel attractions since the acquisition, with Iron Man Experience at the former and Guardians of the Galaxy – Mission: Breakout! at the latter. Both attractions officially opened in 2017. Only Walt Disney World Resort and Tokyo Disney Resort are barred from having Marvel characters in its parks, due to contractual obligations to Universal and Universal's use of Marvel characters in the region. However, this only includes characters Universal is currently using, other characters in their "families" (Spider-Man, X-Men, Avengers, Fantastic Four, etc.), the villains associated with said characters, and the Marvel name. This clause has allowed Walt Disney World to have meet and greets, merchandise, attractions, and more with other Marvel characters not associated with the characters at Islands of Adventure, such as Star-Lord and Gamora from Guardians of the Galaxy.

Toon Lagoon

Toon Lagoon is based on the cartoon and comic strip characters from King Features Syndicate and Jay Ward. With the area's main focus being water-based rides (hence the name).

The area is also home to a variety of dining outlets and merchandise shops. Food and beverage items can be purchased from Blondie's, Cathy's Ice Cream, Comic Strip Cafe and Wimpy's. Merchandise items can be bought from a variety of themed stores including the Betty Boop store, Gasoline Alley, Toon Extra and Wossamotta U.

Skull Island 

Skull Island is the newest island at the park, having been opened in the summer of 2016. The area's sole attraction, Skull Island: Reign of Kong, opened on July 13, 2016. The attraction and island mark the return of the King Kong character to the Universal Orlando Resort, after the Kongfrontation attraction closed at Universal Studios Florida in 2002 to make way for the Revenge of the Mummy: The Ride.

Jurassic Park

Jurassic Park is themed to the film series of the same name. Set after the events of the first film, the area undertakes the guise of the John Hammond's dinosaur theme park featured in the series. As such, the area is filled with the attractions and exhibits one would find in the "real" Jurassic Park, including thrill rides and discovery-based exhibits.

The Wizarding World of Harry Potter – Hogsmeade

The Wizarding World of Harry Potter – Hogsmeade is themed around the Harry Potter universe, authored by J. K. Rowling. It officially opened to the public on June 18, 2010. On May 31, 2007, Universal announced that it had secured the licensing rights from Warner Bros. and Rowling to incorporate the Harry Potter franchise to Islands of Adventure. The  island features attractions, shops, and restaurants set inside such locations as the Forbidden Forest, Hogsmeade Village, and the iconic Hogwarts Castle. Ground breaking began in 2007, with the official opening scheduled for June 18, 2010, as announced on March 25, 2010. As part of the promotion for the then-upcoming area, a behind-the-scenes documentary on production of the park section is included on the Blu-ray and DVD release of Harry Potter and the Half-Blood Prince.

There are five main attractions in the Wizarding World of Harry Potter:

There is also a singing Frog Choir and a Triwizard Spirit Rally held in the town center. These events feature Hogwarts, Beauxbatons, and Durmstrang students.

An expansion of The Wizarding World of Harry Potter, based on the Diagon Alley and London settings from the series, opened on July 8, 2014, at the adjacent Universal Studios Florida park in the former site of the park's Jaws attraction. The Hogwarts Express attraction connects the two areas of The Wizarding World of Harry Potter in each park.

The Lost Continent
The Lost Continent is themed to ancient myths and legends, and is divided into two sub-sections; an ancient Arabian marketplace called Sinbad's Bazzaar, and a Grecian-Atlantis-esque Lost City. Formerly, the Lost Continent included a medieval section Merlinwood, but the majority of that area was re-themed for the Wizarding World of Harry Potter.  This land is also home to Mythos, which is one of two full-service restaurants in the park and was voted winner of best theme park restaurant by Theme Park Insider for six successive years between 2003 and 2008.

Seuss Landing

Seuss Landing is based on the works of author Dr. Seuss. The island features several Seuss-themed attractions, especially geared towards small children, as well as a Green Eggs and Ham Cafe and Circus McGurkus restaurant. As in the books, one of the unique characteristics of this area is that there is almost no straights line anywhere. Palm trees bent by the winds of Hurricane Andrew were even planted in the area to continue this theme.

The area is also home to a variety of dining outlets and merchandise shops. Food and beverage items can be purchased from Circus McGurkus Cafe Stoo-pendous (The High in the Sky Seuss Trolley Train Ride), Green Eggs and Ham Cafe (opened seasonally), Hop on Pop Ice Cream Shop, and Moose Juice, Goose Juice. Merchandise items can be bought from a variety of themed stores including Cats, Hats & Things (The Cat in the Hat), All The Books You Can Read (The High in the Sky Seuss Trolley Train Ride), Snookers & Snookers Sweet Candy Cookers, and Mulberry Street Stores Trading Co.

Character appearances
Like the neighboring Universal Studios Florida, Islands of Adventure has a number of famous characters:

Current characters 
 Betty Boop
 Dr. Seuss: Cat in the Hat, Thing 1 and Thing 2, The Grinch, The Lorax, Sam-I-Am, and Guy-Am-I
 Jurassic World: Blue the Raptor
 Madagascar: King Julien XIII
 Marvel Comics: Spider-Man, Captain America, Wolverine, Cyclops, Rogue, Storm, Green Goblin, and Doctor Doom
 Popeye the Sailor Man: Popeye and Olive Oyl
 Rocky & Bullwinkle: Bullwinkle J. Moose
 She-Ra and the Princesses of Power: She-Ra
 Wizarding World: Hogwarts Train Conductor

Universal's Express Pass

Several attractions in Islands of Adventure allow guests to utilize Express Pass. This pass admits users to a separate line for the attraction, which is given priority status when boarding. Express Pass is not a virtual queuing service. Instead, passholders may enter the "Universal Express" line whenever they wish. The price of this pass is not included in the charge for park admission.

Attendance

See also
 List of Universal Studios Orlando attractions
 Incidents at Universal parks

References

External links
 Islands of Adventure Official website
 The Wizarding World of Harry Potter Official website

1999 establishments in Florida
Amusement parks in Orlando, Florida
Tourist attractions in Greater Orlando
Tourist attractions in Orange County, Florida
Islands of Adventure
Universal Parks & Resorts attractions by name
Amusement parks opened in 1999